The Pass Christian Public School District is a public school district based in Pass Christian, Mississippi (U.S.).  The superintendent of the district is Carla J. Evers.

Schools
{| class="wikitable plainrowheaders" style="text-align:center;"
|+Schools (2018–19)
! School !! Grades !! Students !!  !!  !! 
|-
| style="text-align:left;" | Pass Christian High School || 9–12 || 619 || 41.54 || 14.9:1 || 
|-
| style="text-align:left;" | Pass Christian Middle School || 6–8 || 538 || 35.48 || 15.16:1 || 
|-
| style="text-align:left;" | Pass Christian Elementary School || Pre-K–5 || 453 || 28.53|| 15.88:1 || 
|-
| style="text-align:left;" | DeLisle Elementary School || Pre-K–5 || 443 || 26.31 || 16.84:1 || 
|}

Impact of Hurricane Katrina

The August 29, 2005 landfall of Hurricane Katrina a few miles west of Pass Christian severely impacted the district. Pass Christian Middle School was completely destroyed. Pass Christian Elementary School flooded and grew mold over a few months and was not salvageable.  The high school and administration building were severely damaged, and Delisle Elementary School, inland, was lightly damaged. On October 17, 2005, the schools reopened, with approximately 2/3s of the students, in temporary trailers at the Delisle site. The high school was reopened a little less than a year later in October of the 2006–2007 school year.

Demographics

2006–07 school year
There were a total of 1,489 students enrolled in the Pass Christian School District during the 2006–2007 school year. The gender makeup of the district was 51% female and 49% male. The racial makeup of the district was 29.75% African American, 64.47% White, 1.81% Hispanic, 3.83% Asian, and 0.13% Native American. 59.1% of the district's students were eligible to receive free lunch.

Previous school years

Accountability statistics

See also

List of school districts in Mississippi

Notes

References

External links
 

Education in Harrison County, Mississippi
School districts in Mississippi